International Shoe Company Building may refer to the following places:
City Museum, former ISC building in St. Louis
International Shoe Company Building (St. Clair, Missouri), listed on the National Register of Historic Places
International Shoe Company Building (West Plains, Missouri), listed on the National Register of Historic Places
Lemp Brewery, former brewery used by ISC in St. Louis
Roberts, Johnson and Rand-International Shoe Company Complex, listed on the National Register of Historic Places.